Frank Wilkinson (23 May 1914 – 26 March 1984) was an English first-class cricketer.

Born in Hull, Yorkshire, England, Wilkinson was a right arm medium fast bowler and right-handed tail end batsman, who played in fourteen matches for Yorkshire County Cricket Club from 1937 to 1939.  He took twenty six wickets at 22.69 each, with a best return of 7 for 68 against Hampshire.  He averaged 5.61 with the bat in the first-class game, with a highest score of 18 not out. He also appeared for the  Yorkshire Second XI from 1935 to 1939.

Wilkinson died in Hull in March 1984, aged 69.

References

External links
Cricinfo

1914 births
1984 deaths
Yorkshire cricketers
English cricketers
Cricketers from Kingston upon Hull
English cricketers of 1919 to 1945
Minor Counties cricketers